The 2000 MTV Movie Awards were hosted by Sarah Jessica Parker.  In conjunction with the success of Sex and the City, the awards show presented a parody of Sex and the City and The Matrix during the program's opening. It featured the SATC cast (Samantha Jones, Miranda Hobbes, and Charlotte York) as they listened intently as Carrie Bradshaw (Parker's character on the series) describes getting caught in the Matrix, which is shown in flashbacks and in the narration style heard usually on the TV series. Laurence Fishburne appeared in the spoof in a creative superimposition from the film, as well as Vince Vaughn (playing the supposed "White Rabbit") and Jimmy Fallon, who played Keanu Reeves's character, Neo, from the film. Also, it noted Parker's status as a fashion icon by appearing in no less than 15 different costumes during the duration of the awards ceremonies, even appearing in nothing but a bath towel.

Performers
D'Angelo — "Devil's Pie"
NSYNC — "It's Gonna Be Me"
Metallica — "I Disappear"

Presenters
Amy Smart and Tom Green — presented Best On-Screen Duo
Mena Suvari and Jason Biggs — presented Best Kiss
George Clooney and Mark Wahlberg — presented Best Villain
Seth Green and Q-Tip — introduced D'Angelo
Katie Holmes and Jamie Foxx — presented Breakthrough Female
Lucy Liu and Ice Cube — presented Best Fight
Aaliyah and Freddie Prinze Jr. — presented Best Action Sequence
Rebecca Romijn and Halle Berry — presented Best Musical Sequence
Sarah Michelle Gellar and Chris Klein — presented Breakthrough Male
Denise Richards and Marlon Wayans — introduced NSYNC
Samuel L. Jackson — presented Best Comedic Performance
Cameron Diaz and Catherine Keener — presented Best New Filmmaker
Janet Jackson — presented Best Male Performance
Nicolas Cage — presented Best Female Performance
Benicio del Toro and Ryan Phillippe — introduced Metallica
Mel Gibson — presented Best Movie

Awards

Best Movie
The Matrix
 American Beauty
 American Pie
 Austin Powers: The Spy Who Shagged Me
 The Sixth Sense

Best Male Performance
Keanu Reeves – The Matrix
 Jim Carrey – Man on the Moon
 Ryan Phillippe – Cruel Intentions
 Adam Sandler – Big Daddy
 Bruce Willis – The Sixth Sense

Best Female Performance
Sarah Michelle Gellar – Cruel Intentions
 Drew Barrymore – Never Been Kissed
 Neve Campbell – Scream 3
 Ashley Judd – Double Jeopardy
 Julia Roberts – Runaway Bride

Breakthrough Male
Haley Joel Osment – The Sixth Sense
 Wes Bentley – American Beauty
 Jason Biggs – American Pie
 Michael Clarke Duncan – The Green Mile
 Jamie Foxx – Any Given Sunday

Breakthrough Female
Julia Stiles – 10 Things I Hate About You
 Selma Blair – Cruel Intentions
 Shannon Elizabeth – American Pie
 Carrie-Anne Moss – The Matrix
 Hilary Swank – Boys Don't Cry

Best On-Screen Duo
Mike Myers and Verne Troyer – Austin Powers: The Spy Who Shagged Me
 Tom Hanks and Tim Allen – Toy Story 2
 Keanu Reeves and Laurence Fishburne – The Matrix
 Adam Sandler and Dylan and Cole Sprouse – Big Daddy
 Bruce Willis and Haley Joel Osment – The Sixth Sense

Best Villain
Mike Myers – Austin Powers: The Spy Who Shagged Me
 Matt Damon – The Talented Mr. Ripley
 Sarah Michelle Gellar – Cruel Intentions
 Ray Park – Star Wars: Episode I – The Phantom Menace
 Christopher Walken – Sleepy Hollow

Best Comedic Performance
Adam Sandler – Big Daddy
 Jason Biggs – American Pie
 Ice Cube – Next Friday
 Mike Myers – Austin Powers: The Spy Who Shagged Me
 Parker Posey – Scream 3

Best Kiss
Sarah Michelle Gellar and Selma Blair – Cruel Intentions
 Drew Barrymore and Michael Vartan – Never Been Kissed
 Katie Holmes and Barry Watson – Teaching Mrs. Tingle
 Hilary Swank and Chloë Sevigny – Boys Don't Cry

Best Action Sequence
The Pod Race – Star Wars: Episode I – The Phantom Menace
 End Sequence – The Blair Witch Project
 Rooftop/Helicopter Scene – The Matrix
 Sand Monster Scene – The Mummy

Best Musical Sequence
Terrence and Philip — "Uncle F**ka" (from South Park: Bigger, Longer & Uncut)
 Heath Ledger — "Can't Take My Eyes Off You" (from 10 Things I Hate About You)
 Mike Myers and Verne Troyer — "Just the Two of Us" (from Austin Powers: The Spy Who Shagged Me)
 Matt Damon, Jude Law and Rosario Fiorello — "Tu Vuo' Fa L'Americano" (from The Talented Mr. Ripley)

Best Fight
Keanu Reeves vs. Laurence Fishburne – The Matrix
 Mike Myers vs. Verne Troyer – Austin Powers: The Spy Who Shagged Me
 Liam Neeson and Ewan McGregor vs. Ray Park – Star Wars: Episode I – The Phantom Menace
 Edward Norton vs. Himself – Fight Club

Best New Filmmaker
 Spike Jonze – Being John Malkovich

External links
 MTV winners list
 MTV Movie Awards: 2000  at the Internet Movie Database

2000
Mtv Movie Awards
MTV Movie Awards
2000 in Los Angeles
2000 in American cinema